Acrobasis latifasciella is a species of snout moth in the genus Acrobasis. It was described by Harrison Gray Dyar Jr., in 1908, and is known from the northeastern United States.

The larvae feed on Juglans nigra and possibly Carya species.

References

Moths described in 1908
Acrobasis
Moths of North America